Matthew Chinsammy (born 25 September 1974) is a Guyanese cricketer. He played in one first-class match for Guyana in 1996/97.

See also
 List of Guyanese representative cricketers

References

External links
 

1974 births
Living people
Guyanese cricketers
Guyana cricketers